The 2022–23 UEFA Nations League is the third season of the UEFA Nations League, an international association football competition involving the men's national teams of the 55 member associations of UEFA. The competition is being held from June to September 2022 (league phase), June 2023 (Nations League Finals) and March 2024 (relegation play-outs).

Following their win in 2021, defending champions France were unable to retain their title in the finals after finishing third in their group.

Format
The 55 UEFA national teams were divided into four leagues, with Leagues A, B and C featuring 16 teams each, divided into four groups of four teams. League D features 7 teams divided into two groups, with one containing four teams and the other containing three. The teams were allocated to leagues based on the 2020–21 UEFA Nations League overall ranking. Each team will play six matches within their group, except for one group in League D which will play four, using the home-and-away round-robin format in June (four matchdays) and September 2022 (two matchdays).

In the top division, League A, teams compete to become the UEFA Nations League champions. The four group winners of League A qualify for the Nations League Finals in June 2023, which is played in a knockout format, consisting of the semi-finals, third place play-off and final. The semi-final pairings, along with the administrative home teams for the third place play-off and final, are determined by means of a draw. The host country will be selected among the four qualified teams by the UEFA Executive Committee, with the winners of the final crowned as the Nations League champions.

Teams also compete for promotion and relegation to a higher or lower league. The group winners in Leagues B, C and D are promoted, while the last-placed teams of each group in Leagues A and B are relegated. As League C has four groups while League D has only two, the two League C teams which are to be relegated will be determined by play-outs in March 2024. Based on the Nations League overall ranking of the fourth-placed teams, the first-ranked team will face the fourth-ranked team, and the second-ranked team will face the third-ranked team. Two ties will be played over two legs, with the higher-ranked team hosting the second leg. The team that scores more goals on aggregate over the two legs will remain in League C, while the loser will be relegated to League D. If the aggregate score is level, extra time is played (the away goals rule is not applied). If the score remains level after extra time, a penalty shoot-out is used to decide the winner.

Tiebreakers for group ranking
If two or more teams in the same group are equal on points on completion of the league phase, the following tie-breaking criteria are applied:
 Higher number of points obtained in the matches played among the teams in question;
 Superior goal difference in matches played among the teams in question;
 Higher number of goals scored in the matches played among the teams in question;
 If, after having applied criteria 1 to 3, teams still have an equal ranking, criteria 1 to 3 are reapplied exclusively to the matches between the teams in question to determine their final rankings. If this procedure does not lead to a decision, criteria 5 to 11 apply;
 Superior goal difference in all group matches;
 Higher number of goals scored in all group matches;
 Higher number of away goals scored in all group matches;
 Higher number of wins in all group matches;
 Higher number of away wins in all group matches;
 Lower disciplinary points total in all group matches (1 point for a single yellow card, 3 points for a red card as a consequence of two yellow cards, 3 points for a direct red card, 4 points for a yellow card followed by a direct red card).
 Position in the 2022–23 UEFA Nations League access list.
Notes

Criteria for league ranking
Individual league rankings are established according to the following criteria:
 Position in the group;
 Higher number of points;
 Superior goal difference;
 Higher number of goals scored;
 Higher number of goals scored away from home;
 Higher number of wins;
 Higher number of wins away from home;
 Lower disciplinary points total (1 point for a single yellow card, 3 points for a red card as a consequence of two yellow cards, 3 points for a direct red card, 4 points for a yellow card followed by a direct red card).
 Position in the 2022–23 UEFA Nations League access list.

In order to rank teams in Leagues B and D, which are composed of different sized groups, the results against the fourth-placed teams in these leagues are not taken into account for the purposes of comparing teams placed first, second and third in their respective groups.

The ranking of the top 4 teams in League A are determined by their finish in the Nations League Finals.

Criteria for overall ranking
The overall UEFA Nations League rankings are established as follows:
 The 16 League A teams are ranked 1st to 16th according to their league rankings.
 The 16 League B teams are ranked 17th to 32nd according to their league rankings.
 The 16 League C teams are ranked 33rd to 48th according to their league rankings.
 The 7 League D teams are ranked 49th to 55th according to their league rankings.

UEFA Euro 2024 qualifying

The 2022–23 UEFA Nations League is linked with UEFA Euro 2024 qualifying, providing teams another chance to qualify for UEFA Euro 2024.

The Euro 2024 qualifying group stage will take place from March to November 2023, deciding 20 of the 23 teams that will advance to the final tournament to join hosts Germany. The 54 teams will be drawn into ten groups after the completion of the UEFA Nations League (six groups of five teams and four groups of six teams, with the four participants in the 2023 UEFA Nations League Finals guaranteed to be drawn into groups of five teams), with the top two teams in each group qualifying. The draw seeding will be based on the overall ranking of the Nations League.

Following the qualifying group stage, the UEFA Euro 2024 qualifying play-offs will take place in March 2024. The participants of the play-offs will not be decided based on results from the qualifying group stage. Instead, twelve teams will be selected based on their performance in the 2022–23 Nations League. These teams will be divided into three paths, each containing four teams, with one team from each path qualifying for the final tournament. The group winners of Nations Leagues A, B and C will automatically qualify for the play-off path of their league unless they have qualified for the final tournament via the qualifying group stage. If a group winner has already qualified through the qualifying group stage, they will be replaced by the next best-ranked team in the same league. However, if there are not enough non-qualified teams in the same league, then the spot will go first to the best-ranked group winner of League D, unless that team has already qualified for the final tournament. The remaining slots are then allocated to next best team in the Nations League overall ranking. However, group winners of Leagues B and C cannot face teams from a higher league.

The three play-off paths will each feature two single-legged semi-finals and one single-legged final. In the semi-finals, the best-ranked team will host the fourth-ranked team, and the second-ranked team will host the third-ranked team. The host of the final will be drawn between the winners of the semi-final pairings. The three play-off path winners will join the twenty teams that already qualified for the final tournament through the group stage.

Schedule
Below is the schedule of the 2022–23 UEFA Nations League. Due to the 2022 FIFA World Cup in Qatar took place at the end of the year, the league phase was played in June and September 2022.

The fixture list was confirmed by UEFA on 17 December 2021, the day following the draw. The fixture list for groups A4 and B1 were amended due to the postponement of Path A of UEFA qualifying for the World Cup.

The relegation play-outs of League C are scheduled on the same dates as the UEFA Euro 2024 qualifying play-offs. If one or more of the teams due to participate in the relegation play-outs also qualifies for the UEFA Euro 2024 qualifying play-offs, the relegation play-outs will be cancelled and the teams in League C ranked 47th and 48th in the Nations League overall ranking will be automatically relegated.

Seeding

All 55 UEFA national teams will enter the competition. The teams which finished bottom of their group in Leagues A and B, as well as the losers from the relegation play-outs of League C, from the 2020–21 season will move down a league, while the group winners of Leagues B, C and D will move up. The remaining teams will stay in their respective leagues.

In the 2022–23 access list, UEFA ranked teams based on the 2020–21 Nations League overall ranking, with a slight modification: teams that were relegated in the previous season were ranked immediately below those who were promoted. The seeding pots for the league phase were based on the access list ranking. The seeding pots, draw procedure and fixture list procedures were confirmed by the UEFA Executive Committee during their meeting in Chișinău, Moldova, on 22 September 2021.

The draw for the league phase took place at the UEFA headquarters in Nyon, Switzerland, on 16 December 2021, 18:00 CET. The draw, originally planned to take place in Montreux, was held behind closed doors due to the COVID-19 pandemic.

As the league phase will be played in June and September 2022, no winter venue restrictions were applied in the draw. For political reasons, Russia and Ukraine (due to the Russian military intervention in Ukraine) could not be drawn in the same group. Due to restrictions of excessive travel, any group could contain a maximum of one of the following pairs: Andorra and Kazakhstan, Malta and Kazakhstan, Northern Ireland and Kazakhstan, Gibraltar and Azerbaijan, Armenia and Iceland, Israel and Iceland.

League A

Group A1

Group A2

Group A3

Group A4

Nations League Finals

Bracket

Semi-finals

Third-place play-off

Final

Top goalscorers

League B

Group B1

Group B2

Group B3

Group B4

Top goalscorers

League C

Group C1

Group C2

Group C3

Group C4

Relegation play-outs

Top goalscorers

League D

Group D1

Group D2

Top goalscorers

Overall ranking
The results of each team are used to calculate the overall ranking of the competition, which were used for seeding in the UEFA Euro 2024 qualifying group stage draw.

Euro 2024 qualifying play-offs

Teams who fail in the UEFA Euro 2024 qualifying group stage can still qualify for the final tournament via the play-offs. Leagues A, B and C in the UEFA Nations League are allocated one of the three remaining UEFA Euro 2024 places. Four teams from each of these leagues who have not already qualified for the European Championship finals will compete in the play-offs of their league, which will be played in March 2024. The play-off berths are first allocated to each group winner, and if any of the group winners have already qualified for the European Championship finals, then to the next-best ranked team of the league.

Notes

References

External links

 
2022-23
Nations League
Nations League
Nations League
June 2022 sports events in Europe
September 2022 sports events in Europe
June 2023 sports events in Europe
March 2024 sports events in Europe